Tatiana Deych, née Gladkova is a former competitive ice dancer who represented the Soviet Union. With her skating partner, Igor Shpilband, she won silver at the 1982 World Junior Championships in Oberstdorf, gold at the 1983 World Junior Championships in Sarajevo, and silver at the 1983 Golden Spin of Zagreb. Their coaches were Lyudmila Pakhomova and Gennady Akkerman.

Gladkova studied at the Moscow Institute of Physical Culture. In 2003, she joined the coaching staff at the Detroit Skating Club.

Competitive highlights
(with Shpilband)

References

Navigation

Soviet emigrants to the United States
Soviet female ice dancers
Living people
World Junior Figure Skating Championships medalists
Year of birth missing (living people)